The LGV Provence-Alpes-Côte d'Azur, also referred to as the LGV PACA and LGV Côte d'Azur, is a French high-speed rail project intended to extend the LGV Méditerranée which ends in Marseille toward the French Riviera. It would offer faster journey times between Monaco, Nice, Cannes, Toulon and the north of the country than the Marseille–Ventimiglia railway, opened in the 19th century. The project is not currently funded and construction would begin around 2026 at the earliest.

Route
Three principal route options were considered, mainly concerning the alignment between Avignon, Aix-en-Provence, Toulon and Draguignan.
 The option providing the most time saving between Nice and Avignon uses the speed of the Paris-Nice connection to offer the largest potential clientele base (to compete with one of the strongest internal air traffic routes)
 The most northern route is the shortest between Avignon and Nice and may have a station serving the 'pole scientifique' close to Cadarache
 The longest route passes by Marseille and Toulon, offering the quickest travel time between Marseille and Nice (1:10)

Additional connections between the mediterranean coast between Barcelona, Montpellier, Marseille, Nice and Genoa and the southern cross route towards Toulouse and Bordeaux would be affected; the new line would link Marseille to Genoa in 3:15, and Barcelona in 3:35 (thanks to the LGV Perpignan-Figueres).

The final route alignment decision and its details were announced by French Ecology Minister Jean-Louis Borloo on 30 June 2009, opting for the longest route via Marseille, Toulon, and Nice.

Controversy
This project was subject to public debate between 21 February and 8 July 2005.

There was much local opposition to the project, particularly by various environmental organisations. Additionally differences of opinion due to the vested interests of the three departments concerned (Bouches-du-Rhône, Var and Alpes-Maritimes) caused friction. Local elected officials have approved the project and the presidents of the general committees of the three departments have agreed to propose an alternative route in order to reconcile their respective positions.

Progress
The Conseil d’Orientation des Infrastructures (a council convened to examine future rail projects in France after the inauguration of Emmanuel Macron) recommended taking forward a new line between Marseille and Nice as a priority.

See also
 LGV Méditerranée
 LGV Perpignan-Figueres

References

External links 
 Public debate site (in French)
 

High-speed railway lines in France
Proposed railway lines in France